Henry Flad (July 30, 1824 – July 20, 1898) was a German-born civil engineer who served as an engineering officer in the Union Army during the American Civil War, as a railroad engineer before and during the civil war, and later as a civil engineer after the war.  He helped found and was first president of the Engineers' Club of Saint Louis, and in 1886 was president of the American Society of Civil Engineers.

Biography

Early life
Henry Flad was born July 30, 1824 in the Grand Duchy of Baden near the university town of Heidelberg. His father, Jacob Flad, dying within the same year, his mother Francisca Brunn Flad, very soon afterwards removed to the town of Speyer a few miles distant upon the left bank of the Rhine in the Rhine Palatinate, a province belonging to Bavaria. After passing through the preparatory schools of Speyer, young Henry entered the University of Munich, in Bavaria where he took the polytechnic course.

After his graduation in 1846, at twenty two years of age, he was given a position in the engineering service of the Bavarian Government, his first employment being on works for the improvement of the River Rhine. The years which immediately followed, particularly the years 1848 and 1849, were years of great political commotion throughout Europe. Encouraged by the success of the French Revolution of 1848 which drove out King Louis Philippe I, the longings of the German people for a freer and more united government found such vigorous expression that the princes of the many petty states into which Germany was divided acceded to the convocation of a  National Assembly or Parliament, which, in May 1848, met in Frankfurt to frame a constitution for United Germany. Unfortunately the deliberations of this assembly showed such wide differences of opinion and so little ability to unite in any workable plan that the ardor of the more conservative classes began to cool. The princes seized their opportunity to reassert themselves and repudiated the authority of the Parliament.

In Southern Germany the champions of the Parliament took up arms in its behalf. Amongst them was Henry Flad, then in his twenty fifth year, who joined the Parliamentary army as a captain of engineers. Fortune, however, was against them and after several engagements the Parliamentary army was driven into Switzerland and disbanded. Meantime its leaders were placed under the ban and Captain Flad, with many others, was sentenced to death.

Under these circumstances he very naturally turned his face westward and took passage for the United States where the right of the people to govern themselves has found its fullest expression.

Emigration to America
He landed in New York City in the autumn of 1849. His first employment after his landing was as a draftsman in an architect's office. It was not long, however, before he entered the engineering service of the Erie Railroad, then under construction, his headquarters being at Dunkirk, New York at the extreme western end of the road. Mr James P. Kirkwood and Mr James H. Morley with whom Captain Flad was afterwards associated, were also employed at this time on the same road. After the completion of the New York and Erie Railroad in 1851, we hear of Captain Flad, first as located for a time at Tonawanda between Niagara Falls and Buffalo, and then, in 1852, as an assistant engineer in the construction of the Ohio and Mississippi Railroad from Cincinnati to St. Louis, his headquarters being at Vincennes, Indiana.

Upon the opening of the Ohio and Mississippi Railroad to St. Louis in 1854 (this being the first railway to reach St Louis from the East) Captain Flad went to Missouri as an assistant engineer on the Iron Mountain Railroad, of which his former colleague on the Erie Railroad, Mr. James H. Morley, was the chief engineer. During the construction of this road Captain Flad was located at Potosi, Missouri. After its completion to Pilot Knob, where for a number of years it ended, he became land and tie agent of the railroad company, with headquarters at Arcadia, Missouri. On September 12, 1856, Captain Flad was married to Miss Reichard of St. Louis.

Civil War
Upon the outbreak of the Civil War in 1861, Captain Flad came to St. Louis and enlisted, June 15, as a private soldier in Company F, of the Third Regiment, United States Reserve Corps. From this rank he rose rapidly, advanced to be corporal and then sergeant.

In July 1861 a regiment known as the Engineer Regiment of the West recruited mainly in the States of Illinois and Missouri, was organized by Col. J. W. Bissell, and Henry Flad was made captain of Company B. In August of the same year he was detailed by General Frémont, then in command at St. Louis, for service in the construction of fortifications at Cape Girardeau, Missouri, where he remained for several months. Later in the year, when Frémont was succeeded by General Halleck, Captain Flad was ordered to join General Pope in southeast Missouri, and served as a staff officer through the campaign of New Madrid and Point Pleasant and the taking of Island Number Ten, after which he rejoined his regiment at New Madrid. He was with his regiment at Fort Pillow and Pittsburgh Landing and in the operations before Corinth. During the summer of 1862 he was engaged in repairing the Mobile and Ohio Railroad, in building forts at Corinth, and in repairing the Mississippi Central Railroad. He was also engaged in Grant's advance on Grenada. In February, 1863, he was ordered to Young's Point, where he was employed in engineering work, as he was later at Baxter Bayou, Lake Providence, and Bayou Macon.

In April 1863, under Colonel William W. Wright he had charge of the repairs of the Memphis and Charleston Railroad at Memphis, Grand Junction, Jackson, and Columbus. In October of the same year he was employed in repairing the same railroad east of Corinth under General Sherman and was with him at Cherokee, Bear Creek and Iuka in northern Mississippi.

Meantime he had been promoted, November 17, 1862, to the rank of Major, July 30, 1863, to that of Lieutenant Colonel, and October 16, 1863 to that of Colonel. On January 1, 1864 at Nashville, Tennessee he was transferred as Colonel to the First Regiment of Engineers Missouri Volunteers, a new regiment formed by the consolidation of the former engineer regiment and the Twenty-fifth Missouri Infantry. During the summer of 1864, again under Colonel Wright, he was engaged in completing the Nashville and Northwestern Rail road from Nashville to Johnsonville and in constructing defensive works. In August he was ordered to Atlanta, Georgia and served here and in this neighborhood until about the first of November, his last work being the construction of a new line of fortifications at Atlanta.

At this time the term of enlistment of seven companies expired. The command of the remaining five companies, then under the army regulations, devolved upon the Lieutenant Colonel, and the Colonel was mustered out November 12, 1864 at Nashville, Tennessee. His term of service had been three years and six months, during which time with not more than a week's leave of absence he had been constantly in the field. Through it all he was never sick, wounded, or captured.

Post Civil War

St. Louis Waterworks
Upon being mustered out Colonel Flad returned to St. Louis and began to look around for employment in his profession. In a short time the agitation for an improved water supply for St. Louis, Missouri took form in a State law authorizing the appointment of a Board of Water Commissioners, charged with the duty of making surveys and plans and constructing a new system of waterworks for the city. Soon after the organization of the new board, in the spring of 1865, Mr. James P. Kirkwood, who had formerly been chief engineer of the Missouri Pacific Railroad and had just completed the building of new waterworks for Brooklyn, New York, was appointed chief engineer, and Henry Flad chief assistant engineer.

Surveys and investigations were at once begun, and by the end of the year, a plan was presented for new works with intake, settling basins and filter beds at the Chain of Rocks, and a distributing reservoir on what was then known as Rinkels Hill, on Easton Avenue near the present city limits. This plan received the approval of the Board of Water Commissioners, and, as subsequent experience has abundantly proven, was undoubtedly the best. But, besides running counter to some private interests, it involved such a large outlay and such a radical departure from the old plan that on the part of many leading citizens as well as the city authorities it encountered an overwhelming disapproval. The opposition finally became so great that the Water Commissioners were called upon by the City Council to resign. To this demand they presently acceded, and in July, 1866, a new board, committed to a new plan, was appointed. Meantime Mr. Kirkwood had been commissioned to go to Europe to study the subject of filtration, and Colonel Flad was left as acting chief engineer. In December, 1866, a revised plan, with intake and settling basins at Bissell Point and a distributing reservoir on Compton Hill, substantially as afterwards built, was presented.

Early in the following year the act organizing the Board of Water Commissioners was amended, the number of members being reduced from four to three, and in March, 1867, a new board was appointed with Colonel Flad as one of its members. This position by reappointment he held continuously for eight years, or until April 1875. During this time and under his general supervision, the new waterworks were completed and put into service during the year 1872.

Eads Bridge
Whilst he was still acting as assistant engineer to Mr Kirkwood, Colonel Flad made the acquaintance of Captain James B Eads who was at that time employed upon plans for gun carriages and turrets. The rooms occupied by the Water Board being larger than they then needed, Captain Eads, upon his request, had been granted space in which to set a draftsman at work. This was followed by frequent discussions between the two men upon engineering questions, and this led to a mutual recognition of each other's abilities and laid the foundation of a lifelong friendship. When therefore in 1868 Captain Eads was ready, as chief promoter as well as chief engineer, to begin the work of constructing the great bridge over the Mississippi River at St Louis, he very naturally tendered the position of chief assistant engineer to Colonel Flad. As the duties of the latter, as member of the Board of Water Commissioners, did not require all his time, this opportunity to take part in this most interesting and important work was gladly accepted, and he retained his connection with it until its completion in 1874. Some of the boldest features of this great enterprise, such as the method of erection without falsework, were due to Colonel Flad.

Public works in St. Louis, Missouri
During 1875 and 1876 he was engaged as consulting engineer in various works in conjunction with Mr. Charles Pfeiffer, who had been associated with him on the St. Louis bridge, Mr. Thomas J. Whitman, chief engineer of the Waterworks, and Prof. Charles A. Smith of Washington University.

Amongst other engagements he was engineer for the commissioners who purchased and laid out Forest Park.

In the autumn of 1876 the new charter of the city of St. Louis, by virtue of which the city was separated from the county of St Louis and made, as to its local affairs, to a large degree independent of the State Legislature, was inaugurated, and Colonel Flad was elected the first President of the newly constituted Board of Public Improvements. This office he held continuously for nearly fourteen years being re-elected in 1880, 1884, and 1888.

The problem to which the new board addressed itself was that of taking the whole system of municipal public works out of the mire of politics and placing them upon the basis of merit and fitness. Into this work Colonel Flad entered with characteristic zeal and a determination which nothing could shake. His efforts were crowned with entire success, so that during the whole period of his administration the board over which he presided had the entire confidence of the whole community. Every citizen felt sure that in every department of the public works the city received a dollar's worth for every dollar spent, and in this respect St. Louis became a model for other cities.

In the spring of 1890, having become somewhat weary under the increasing burdens of his position, he resigned his office as President of the Board of Public Improvements to accept membership in the Mississippi River Commission in the place made vacant by the resignation of Captain Eads. In this latter position he remained until his death, giving to the work his best energies and nearly the whole of his time. The new policy of deepening the low water channel of the river by dredging rather than by contraction works, which the commission adopted during his membership, was very largely the result of his efforts. Colonel Flad was a charter member of the Engineers Club of St Louis, and was its President for twelve years, from 1868 to 1880. He became a member of the American Society of Civil Engineers February 15, 1871, and was President of the Society for the year ending January 19, 1887, thus receiving from both organizations the highest honors within their power to bestow.

Death
His death occurred June 20, 1898, at Pittsburgh, Pennsylvania where he stopped on his way home from a meeting of the Mississippi River Commission to visit Mr Godfrey Stengel, a lifelong friend who had come with him on the same ship to America forty nine years before. He died very suddenly of acute heart failure while walking to Highland park in company with Mr and Mrs Stengel. Up to the last moment he was in excellent spirits and died without pain as without fear.

Legacy
As an engineer Colonel Flad was remarkable for his great fertility of invention. For every new problem he had not only one but many solutions and the rapidity with which he grasped all its conditions and framed his plans to meet them amounted to genius. In doing this he was not limited by precedent but looked instinctively for new and better methods than any before known. In boldness and originality he has had but few equals in the annals of the profession. And like the most successful workers in every field he delighted in his work for its own sake. Nothing could exceed the interest with which he attacked a new problem and he gave himself no rest until he had solved it. The solution once found however the whole subject ceased to interest him and he passed on to something new. This trait is illustrated by the fact that although he took out numerous patents for new and useful inventions to their introduction and utilization he gave no thought. It was the work rather than its rewards for which he cared. As a man he was equally great. His unassuming modesty, his perfect candor, and simplicity, his unflinching courage, his absolute fidelity to his convictions, his single minded subordination of personal to the public welfare, qualities which were written in every line of his face and manifested in every act of his life, all stamped him as a man of the highest type. No one who knew him but believed in him without limit. His name was a synonym for fidelity and skill and all knew that every work committed to his charge would be well done and come from his hand as sound and flawless as the man himself. This evident and perfect integrity of purpose made his public service a legacy of incalculable value to his fellow citizens. His life was a demonstration of how honorable the public service could be made and is an encouragement to those who have not yet lost faith in the possibility of having this service in all its branches lifted to the same standard to abate no jot of heart or hope but still work on for the accomplishment of this high end. To us his fellows in his chosen calling his name and example are specially precious For in him was realized the highest ideal of the engineer, a man of trained intellect controlled by an iron will and directed to the noblest public ends And  the fact of his success in attaining this ideal will inspire others to frame their lives upon the same noble lines.

Flad Avenue in St. Louis is named after Henry Flad.

References
 This article incorporates text from this source, which is in the public domain.

Further reading
 William Baehr, Henry Flad Papers, Special Collection and Archives, Southeast Missouri State University

External links
Colonel Henry Flad, 1st MO Eng. USV

1824 births
1898 deaths
American civil engineers
Ludwig Maximilian University of Munich alumni
German emigrants to the United States
German-American Forty-Eighters
Union Army colonels